The discography of Skid Row, an American heavy metal band, consists of five studio albums, four EPs, and one compilation album.

Skid Row was formed in 1986 in Toms River, New Jersey. They were most successful in the late 1980s and early '90s when their first two albums with lead singer Sebastian Bach and drummer Rob Affuso were multi-platinum successes. Their current line-up consists of Erik Grönwall (vocals), Dave "The Snake" Sabo, Scotti Hill (guitar), Rachel Bolan (bass), and Rob Hammersmith (drums). As of the end of 1996, the band has sold over 20 million albums worldwide.

Albums

Studio albums

Compilation albums

Extended plays

Singles

Videography

Video albums

Music videos

References

External links
 

Discography
Discographies of American artists
Rock music group discographies